"Candy (Drippin' Like Water)" is the third single by Snoop Dogg from his 2006 album Tha Blue Carpet Treatment, produced by Rick Rock. It features E-40, MC Eiht, Goldie Loc and Tha Dogg Pound (Daz Dillinger and Kurupt), and Ladybug on the chorus. The song title and sample come from Ladybug Mecca's vocals on Digable Planets's "9th Wonder (Blackitolism)". "Candy" refers to a high gloss paint finish applied to automobiles. In the song it is also used as a euphemism for marijuana, cocaine and sex.

Music video
The video was filmed on Hollywood Boulevard in Hollywood, Los Angeles.  The women in it wore different colored wigs.  It features a lot of candy and a Snoop Dogg plaque. It has cameo appearances by Kam, JT The Bigga Figga and Ladybug who adlibs the choruses.

Personnel
Written by C. Broadus, E. Stephens, K. Spillman, D. Arnaud, R. Brown, A. Tyler, R. Thomas, R. Emmanuel, Butler, Vieira, Irving, L. Blackmon, T. Jenkins) 
Produced by RickRock for Sharick & Mook Inc.
Publishers: My Own Chit Publishing/EMI Blackwood Music (BMI); Heavy On The Grind Entertainment Publishing (BMI); Lil Gangsta Music (ASCAP); Dogg Pound Music (BMI); Scodie Mac (BMI); Gaffled Em Up (BMI); Cypher Cliff Music Publishing (ASCAP); EMI
Video Production : Snoopadelic Films
Video director : Pook Brown of Soopadelic Films
Video appearance of JT the Bigga Figga is by the courtesy of Get Low Recordz.

References

2006 singles
Snoop Dogg songs
E-40 songs
Tha Dogg Pound songs
Songs written by Snoop Dogg
Songs about cannabis
Songs about drugs
Songs written by E-40
Posse cuts
Songs written by Daz Dillinger
Songs written by Kurupt
Songs written by Rick Rock